Venusia syngenes is a moth in the family Geometridae first described by Wehrli in 1931. It is found in China.

References

Moths described in 1931
Venusia (moth)